The 2009 European Diving Championships was the first edition of the European Diving Championships and took part from 1–5 April 2009 in Turin, Italy. For the first time, the event was held separately from the European Swimming Championships. The event was held on Monumentale Diving Stadium. The former capital of Italy was hosting European Diving Championships for the third time after 1954 and 2009. A total of ten disciplines was on the schedule. Additionally, there was a team event on the first day of competition.

Results

Men

Women

Medal table

References

External links 
 Official website

2009
2009 European Diving Championships
European Diving Championships
European Diving Championships
2009 European Diving Championships
Sports competitions in Turin